Dancing in Your Head is a studio album by jazz artist Ornette Coleman, released in 1977 by Horizon Records.

Recording 

"Theme from a Symphony" was the first recording to feature Coleman's electric band, which later became known as Prime Time. The symphony referenced is Coleman's own Skies of America.

William S. Burroughs was present for the recording of "Midnight Sunrise", which was recorded with the Master Musicians of Jajouka in 1973. The compact disc reissue features an alternate take of this composition, which is not present on the vinyl or earlier CD issue.

Release 

Dancing in Your Head was released originally on A&M Records, but it was re-mastered and re-released in 2000 on A&M/Verve/Universal Records. Its catalog number is 543 519.

Critical reception 
Dancing in Your Head was voted the 15th best album of the year in The Village Voices annual Pazz & Jop critics poll for 1977. It was the first album by a jazz artist to make the poll. Robert Christgau, the poll's creator, ranked it number 11 on his own year-end list.
The album was identified by Chris Kelsey in his Allmusic essay "Free Jazz: A Subjective History" as one of the 20 Essential Free Jazz Albums.

Legacy 

"Midnight Sunrise" was featured in the film Naked Lunch, an allusion to the fact that William S. Burroughs, the author of the book of the same name, which the film is partially based on, was present during the recording sessions of this composition.

Track listing 

Notes
The alternate take to "Midnight Sunrise" was a bonus track on the 2000 CD edition.

Personnel 
 Ornette Coleman - alto saxophone
 Bern Nix - 1st lead guitar
 Charlie Ellerbee - 2nd lead guitar
 Rudy McDaniel - Bass guitar
 Shannon Jackson - drums
 Robert Palmer - clarinet on "Midnight Sunrise"
 Master Musicians of Jajouka on "Midnight Sunrise"

References

External links 
 The Wire′s "100 Records That Set The World On Fire (When No One Was Listening)" at Discogs

Ornette Coleman albums
Horizon Records albums
1975 albums
Free jazz albums